Damik Alonzo Scafe (born April 26, 1988) is a former American football defensive end. He was originally signed by the San Diego Chargers as an undrafted free agent in 2011. He played college football at Boston College.

Early life
Scafe earned Hartford Courant All-State honors as a senior defensive lineman at Windsor High School. He also gained All-State accolades from the Connecticut High School Coaches Association.
Scafe was childhood friends with NFL nose tackle Terrance Knighton and Chris Baker since high school, where the three of them were teammates.

College career
Scafe was a starter on the Eagles defensive line in his last two years with Boston College (2009, 2010).

Professional career
He began his rookie season on the Reserve/Injured list and spent the final four weeks on the Chargers' practice squad.

He made his NFL  debut on December 23, 2012 against the New York Jets and appeared in final two games as sub, registering one quarterback hit.

Scafe was waived/injured by the Chargers on August 18, 2014. He waived on May 5, 2015.

References

External links
 Boston College Eagles bio 

1988 births
Living people
People from Windsor, Connecticut
Players of American football from Connecticut
American football defensive ends
American football defensive tackles
Boston College Eagles football players
San Diego Chargers players